The Arizona Complex League Diamondbacks are a professional baseball team competing as a Rookie-level affiliate of the Arizona Diamondbacks in the Arizona Complex League of Minor League Baseball. The team plays its home games at Salt River Fields at Talking Stick near Scottsdale, Arizona. The team is composed mainly of players who are in their first year of professional baseball either as draftees or non-drafted free agents from the United States, Canada, Dominican Republic, Venezuela, and other countries.

History
While the major-league Arizona Diamondbacks began play in 1998, their rookie league team (initially known as the Phoenix Diamondbacks) first competed in the Arizona League (AZL) in 1996, in order to jump start player development, and were the first team with a Diamondbacks affiliation to begin play. They played at Scottsdale Stadium and Phoenix Municipal Stadium during 1996–1997, and at Tucson Electric Park during 1998–2000. 

The Diamondbacks did not field an Arizona-based rookie league team from 2001 to 2010; the team returned to the league in 2011. Prior to the 2021 season, the Arizona League was renamed as the Arizona Complex League (ACL).

Roster

Minor league affiliations

References

External links
 Official Site
 Baseball Reference

Arizona Complex League teams
Arizona Diamondbacks minor league affiliates
Professional baseball teams in Arizona
1996 establishments in Arizona
Baseball teams established in 1996